Bajna is a small village located at an elevation of 934 meters on the Shinkiari – Baffa road (which itself connects with the Karakoram Highway at both ends), in the Mansehra District at a distance of about 20 km from Mansehra city. Chinnar is the prominent mohalla in Bajna village. The area has numerous natural springs, pine trees and farming areas known for its vegetable production. Bajna is also known for its production of potatoes, turnip, and other seasonal vegetables. The main occupation of the people living here is teaching and farming. A river named Darya-e-Siran flow by the village, with a cricket ground. The literacy rate of Bajna is high but not that well; there is a Government High School for Boys and Middle school for Girls, which has been upgraded to High School now and there are other private sector public schools too.

The village contains two mosques, the Majsid Abu Bakr Siddique and the Masjid Farooq e Aazam mosque. Bajna residents are mostly Pashtuns but there are people who speak Hindko and Gojri too. The traditional Jirga system is still somehow present.

After the CPEC concrete mixing station establishment, a rapid increase in transportation took place.

Village elders include Sheikh Baba, Shameer Ali Baba, Mir Said Shah Baba & Badiwan Baba.

References

Populated places in Mansehra District